The 2019 season was Chattanooga Red Wolves SC's first of existence. They played in USL League One.

Background 
The formation of USL League One was announced in April 2017, and league officials began touring the country looking for candidate cities for new soccer clubs, one of which was Chattanooga, Tennessee. In August 2018, Chattanooga was announced as an expansion team. On September 11, 2018, the club announced their first head coach, Tim Hankinson. The club then officially announced their name, Chattanooga Red Wolves SC, on September 25, 2018.

Club

Roster 
As of July 28, 2019.

Team management

Competitions

Pre-Season Friendlies

Match reports

USL League One

Standings

Results by round

Match reports

U.S. Open Cup

Transfers

In

Statistics

Appearances and goals

|}

Disciplinary record
Updated: July 28, 2019

References

External links 

Chattanooga Red Wolves SC seasons
Chattanooga Red Wolves SC
Chattanooga Red Wolves SC
Chattanooga Red Wolves SC